Clube Esportivo Nova Esperança, or CENE as they are usually called, is a Brazilian football team founded on 13 December 1999 in Jardim and transferred to Campo Grande in Mato Grosso do Sul. The team is owned by Rev. Moon's Unification Church, as is Atlético Sorocaba.

The club was founded by a group of farm employees. They used to play football as a hobby on the weekends. The club was founded with the help of employees of other farms and local businessmen. The team was initially an amateur team, but the good performance of the squad brought investments, and on December 13, 1999, the club became a professional team, adopting the name Clube Esportivo Nova Esperança. They won the Campeonato Sul-Mato-Grossense in 2002, in 2004, in 2005, and then won again in 2011.

CENE's home stadium is the Arena da Paz, also known as Olho do Furação. It has a maximum capacity of 1,500 people.

Achievements

 Campeonato Sul-Matogrossense:
 Winners (6): 2002, 2004, 2005, 2011, 2013, 2014
 Copa MS:
 Winners: 2010

References

External links
Official website

Unification Church affiliated organizations
CENE
Association football clubs established in 1999
1999 establishments in Brazil
Inactive football clubs in Brazil